Tsumkwe Airport  is an airport serving the village of Tsumkwe in Otjozondjupa Region, Namibia.

See also
List of airports in Namibia
Transport in Namibia

References

External links
OpenStreetMap - Tsumkwe
 OurAirports - Namibia
 Tsumkwe Airport

Airports in Namibia